West Byfleet railway station is a railway station serving the village of West Byfleet, which forms part of the borough of Woking in the English county of Surrey.

History 
It opened in December 1887 as Byfleet, 49 years after the line was first constructed through the area. The station was renamed from Byfleet to West Byfleet on commencement of the Summer timetable, 1950. This reflected the name of the community that had developed around it, being a mile west of the original Byfleet village.

Accidents and incidents 
On 27 December 1946 the station was the scene of the derailment of a Bournemouth to London express service hauled by SR Lord Nelson class 4-6-0, 851 Sir Francis Drake. Only three people suffered minor injuries.

Services
The station is served by all Alton and Woking (stopping) services from London Waterloo.

It adjoins West Byfleet and Woodham which are suburban settlements in the boroughs of Woking and Runnymede, to the south and north of the line, respectively.  As to other towns it is the closest station to parts of the town/suburb of Byfleet and parts of the semi-rural suburb of Pyrford.

The station has three platforms, one of which (platform 2) is rarely used in line with nearby other South West Main Line stations.  The station competes in the broadest sense, not of train company, with faster services at the next nearest station on the line, Woking station.  Both are served by bus routes outside of the Transport for London fare-capped scheme.

 at off-peak times the station has 4 trains per hour in each direction, alternating between Woking and Alton as to the end or start destination to the south-west and both having London (Waterloo) as their north-east terminus. The Alton services calling at fewer intermediate stations (being semi-fast).

Cultural references 

The station frontage appeared in the 1977 movie Adventures of a Private Eye starring Christopher Neil.

Notes

References

External links 

Railway stations in Surrey
DfT Category C2 stations
Railway stations in Great Britain opened in 1887
Former London and South Western Railway stations
Railway stations served by South Western Railway